Like the British Army, the Australian Army does not use the term 'enlisted' to describe its non-commissioned ranks. Instead, personnel who are not commissioned officers are referred to as other ranks. These are soldiers, non-commissioned officers (NCOs) and warrant officers (WOs). Warrant officers are appointed by a warrant which is signed by the Chief of the Army. The insignia for non-commissioned ranks are identical to the British Army up to the rank of warrant officer class two. Since 1976, WO1s and the WO in the Australian Army wear insignia using the Australian Coat of Arms.

Insignia

Ranks

Warrant officer ranks
 Warrant officer (WO) – E10 – the rank held by the Regimental Sergeant Major of the Army (RSM-A), and introduced in 1991.
 Warrant officer class one (WO1) – E9
 Warrant officer class two (WO2) – E8

Senior non-commissioned officer ranks
 Staff sergeant (SSGT) – E7
 Sergeant (SGT) – E6

Junior non-commissioned officer ranks
 Corporal or bombardier (CPL or BDR) – E5
 Lance corporal or lance bombardier (LCPL or LBDR) – E4
Bombardier and lance bombardier are used by members of Royal Australian Artillery. All other corps use corporal and lance corporal.

Private soldier ranks
 Private proficient (PTE(P)) – E3. Also used within the private equivalent ranks
 Private (PTE) – E2. This title is used by members of the following corps:
Royal Australian Army Dental Corps
Royal Australian Army Medical Corps
Royal Australian Army Ordnance Corps
Royal Australian Army Psychology Corps
Royal Australian Corps of Transport
Royal Australian Infantry Corps
Australian Army Catering Corps
Australian Army Intelligence Corps
Different rank titles are used by other corps. These soldiers hold the same rank as a PTE (private equivalent) – E2
Musician (MUSN): AABC
Signalman (SIG): Royal Australian Corps of Signals
Gunner (GNR): Royal Regiment of Australian Artillery
Trooper (TPR): Royal Australian Armoured Corps, Australian Army Aviation, Australian Special Air Service Regiment
Sapper (SPR): Royal Australian Engineers
Craftsman (CFN): Royal Australian Electrical and Mechanical Engineers
Patrolman: Regional Force Surveillance Units (RFSUs) such as the North-West Mobile Force
 Private (pre-completion of initial employment training) – E1
 Recruit (REC /PTE(R)): Members who are undergoing basic training – E0

Private (and equivalent) soldiers in the Australian Army are still commonly referred to as 'diggers'.

Warrant officer appointments and special insignia
There are a number of appointments held by the senior warrant officers in the Australian Army. These are appointments, not ranks. In general, the rank of the incumbents of these positions is WO1, and they wear the WO1 rank insignia. Due to it having its own special insignia which is worn instead of the WO1 rank insignia, the Regimental Sergeant Major of the Army (RSM-A) is unusual. (The RSM-A holds the unique rank of warrant officer (WO), which is senior to WO1).

Other appointments include:
 Academy sergeant major (ASM): "One WO1 is appointed every 3 to 4 years to serve at the Australian Defence Force Academy as the ASM, the position is rotational with the Royal Australian Navy and the Royal Australian Air Force."

Unit level appointments:
 Regimental sergeant major (RSM): The senior soldier in a regiment/battalion sized unit. Known as the RSM, even in units designated as battalions. RSMs hold the rank of WO1.
 Company/squadron/battery sergeant major (CSM/SSM/BSM): The senior soldier in a company/squadron/battery sized sub-unit. Holds the rank WO2.
 Artificer sergeant major (ASM): The senior soldier in a RAEME unit. Can be a WO1 or WO2.

See also
 Australian Army officer rank insignia
 Australian Defence Force ranks
 Royal Australian Air Force (RAAF) rank insignia
 Uniforms of the Australian Army

Notes
Footnotes

  The senior warrant officer in the Australian Army holds the rank of warrant officer (WO) and the appointment of Regimental Sergeant Major of the Army (RSM-A)
  The rank of staff sergeant is being phased out of the Australian Army.
  Private proficient is a 'certification' rather than a rank. Private proficient simply means a private who has completed basic training, initial employment training and is proficient in his/her trade – generally spending twelve months "on the job" first. A PTE(P) soldier does not 'outrank' a PTE soldier for discipline purposes. However, a PTE(P) soldier (also known as a senior soldier/senior digger) may be in charge of tasking and training a junior soldier(s) within their section. A PTE(P) soldier is equivalent to an able seaman in the Royal Australian Navy and a leading aircraftsman/leading aircraftswoman in the Royal Australian Air Force.
  A female soldier's title is signalman/craftsman, not signalwoman/craftswoman.
  Referred to as a "Sig", e.g.: "Sig Smith"
  A private prior to completion of initial employment training (IET) (but post-recruit training) is no different in rank to a private post-IET, however they are on a lower pay grade and are deemed to be an E1 rather than an E2 when equating rank with other nations' armed forces.

Citations

References

External links
 ADF badges of rank (copyright)
 ADF Pay & Conditions Manual - Equivalent ranks and classifications

Australian Army